State Route 191 (SR 191) is a state highway that runs south-to-north in an arc east and north around the Danielsville area, which is northeast of Athens. Its route is located entirely within Madison county in the northeastern part of the U.S. state of Georgia.

Route description
The route begins at an intersection with SR 98 southeast of Danielsville. It heads north and curves northwest to an intersection with SR 281. The highway curves to the west until it meets its northern terminus, an intersection with US 29/SR 8 north of Danielsville.

Major intersections

See also

References

External links

 Georgia Roads (Routes 181 - 200)

191
Transportation in Madison County, Georgia